Ilocos Sur, officially the Province of Ilocos Sur, is a province in the Philippines located in the Ilocos Region in Luzon.  Located on the mouth of the Mestizo River is the capital of Vigan. Ilocos Sur is bordered by Ilocos Norte and Abra to the north, Mountain Province to the east, La Union and Benguet to the south and the South China Sea to the west.

Ilocos Sur was founded by the Spanish conquistador Juan de Salcedo in 1572. It was formed when the north (now Ilocos Norte) split from the south (Ilocos Sur). At that time it included parts of Abra and the upper half of present-day La Unión. The current boundary of the province was permanently defined through Act 2683 signed in March 1917.

The province is home to two UNESCO World Heritage Sites, namely, the Heritage City of Vigan and the Baroque Church of Santa Maria.

History

Before the arrival of the Spaniards, the coastal plains in northwestern Luzón, from Bangui in the north to Namacpacan in the south, were a region called the Ylokos. This region lies in between the China Sea in the west and Northern Cordilleras in the east. The inhabitants built their villages near the small bays on coves called looc in the local dialect. These coastal inhabitants were referred to as Ylocos which literally meant from the lowlands. The entire region was then called by the ancient name Samtoy from sao mi ditoy which in Ilocano translates to our language. The region was later called Ylocos or Ilocos by the Spaniards and its people Ilocanos.

The Ilocos Region was already a thriving and fairly advanced cluster of towns and settlements familiar to Chinese, Japanese and Malay traders when the Spaniard explorer Don Juan de Salcedo arrived in Vigan on June 13, 1572.  The Spanish made Cabigbigaan their headquarters which Salcedo called Villa Fernandina and which eventually gained fame as the Intramuros de Ilocandia. Salcedo declared all of Northern Luzón an encomienda or land grant. Subsequently he became the encomendero of Vigan and Lieutenant Governor of Ylokos until his death in July 1574.

Augustinian missionaries came to colonize the region through evangelization. They established parishes and built churches that still stand today. Three centuries later, Vigan became the seat of the Archdiocese of Nueva Segovia.

A royal decree on February 2, 1818 separated Ilocos Norte from Ilocos Sur, the latter to include the northern part of La Unión (as far as Namacpacan, now Luna) and all of what is now the province of Abra. The sub-province of Lepanto and Amburayan in Mountain Province were annexed by Ilocos Sur.

The passage of Act 2683 by the Philippine Legislature in March 1917 defined the present geographical boundary of the province.

Precolonial era 

In antiquity, Ylocos was known as the land of Samtoy.

The northwestern part of Luzon is home to the Ilocanos of the Malay. According to the chronicles of Fray Andrés Carro, the word Samtoy was applied to ancient Ylokos where the dialect was spoken.  The ancient land of Ylokos extended from Bangui in the north to Aringay in the south. Ylokos is situated between the coast of the South China Sea and the rugged mountain ranges of the Cordillera on a long narrow strip of coastal plain. On the western side, the land is sandy. On the eastern side, near the slopes of the mountains that separates the region from the Mountain Province, the land is rocky, leaving just a narrow strip of plain for cultivation. The mountains come so close to the sea that the public highway must be carved into the mountains. The pressure of increasing population and consequent need for land has made the people of this region thrifty.

Spanish exploration
The coast of Samtoy, already familiar to Chinese and Japanese traders before Magellan's time, was known to the Spanish colonizers in 1572 when Juan de Salcedo traveled along Samtoy or what is now known as the Ilocos Provinces. Sent by Miguel López de Legazpi to explore the whole island of Luzón, Salcedo founded Ciudad Fernandina in 1574 in Bigan in what is now Ilocos Sur. It became the center of Spanish rule and influence including the evangelization and pacification movements.

After Salcedo's exploration, the Spaniards created Samtoy into an encomienda with Villa Fernandina as the capital in Tamag.

Salcedo was lieutenant governor of Ylokos and the encomendero of Bigan when he died on March 11, 1576. Due to his efforts, the settlements in Tagurín, Santa Lucía, Nalbacán, Bantay, Candón and Sinayt were pacified and made to pay tribute to the King of Spain.

Conversion of the natives
To implement Spain's policy, missionaries were sent to convert the natives to Christianity. A Spanish chronicler wrote: "The Ilocos are all Christians and are the humblest and most tractable".

The evangelization of Ilocos Sur was carried out by the Augustinians who established parishes in Santa in 1576, Tagurín in 1586, Santa Lucía in 1586, Nalbacán in 1587, Candón 1591, and Bantay in 1590. In 1641, they built a church in Bigan which 117 years later was to become the cathedral of the Episcopal See of Nueva Segovia.

Partition of Ylokos
Ylokos comprised the present provinces of Ilocos Norte, Ilocos Sur, Abra and a part of Mountain Province.

A royal decree dated February 2, 1818 separated the northern section of Ylokos which became the province of Ilocos Norte. The southern portion, called Ilocos Sur, included the northern part of La Union and all of what is now the province of Abra. In 1854 the province of La Unión was created out of the towns that had belonged to Ilocos Sur and Pangasinan. Ilocos Sur previously extended as far south as Namacpacan (in Luna) with the territory south of this belonging to Pangasinan. Portions of Ilocos Sur in Amburayan were taken from the Mountain Province and incorporated into Ilocos Sur.

Abra, which was part of Ilocos Sur, was created in 1864 with Lepanto as a sub-province to Ilocos Sur and remained as such until March 1971 when the passage of Act made it again a separate province.

Vigan, capital of Ylocos
Vigan is almost four centuries old and was once known as Kabigbigaan from biga, a coarse erect and araceous plant with large and ornate leaves that grows on river banks. Bigan was later changed to Vigan. To the Spaniards it was Villa Fernandina in honor of King Ferdinand.

Vigan was founded in 1574 by Spanish conquistador Juan de Salcedo as the capital of Ylocos. Before Salcedo arrived in Bigan, the town was the center of Malayan civilization with a population of 8,000, greater than that of Manila at the time. It was already enjoying some prosperity, trading with the Chinese and Japanese who brought fine jars, silk and crockery through the nearby port of Pandan, Caoayan.

In the 19th century, Vigan traded with Europe. Ships loaded with indigo went to textile mills on the Continent. The invention of chemical dyes in Germany ruined this industry. Affluent citizens of Vigan stocked their homes with statuettes of brass and iron, dinner wares and other artifacts of European civilization, including fine ivory, inlaid furniture and China wares.

Social institutions
Before Salcedo died in 1576, be bequeathed his encomienda to a select group who continued the tenancy system which developed into the practice of caciquism, landlordism and consequently, usury. The aristocracy of the babaknangs against whom the kaillanes rose in revolt in 1762 is apparent. The two sections of the town — one for the meztizos and the other for the naturales are still distinct. These practices became prominent during the indigo boom at the middle of the 19th century. Caciquism, together with landlordism and usury, was the greatest obstacle to the progress of the province.

Migration
The Spanish colonizers utilized free labor in the development of Ilocos Sur. Resentment of free labor brought about sporadic revolts and those who refused to be slaves or tenants left the region and went to Abra and the Cagayan Valley. From 1898 to the first decade of the 20th century, covered ox carts moved to the rich plains of Pangasinan, Nueva Ecija and Tarlac.  In these travels, the children were told tales of Lam-ang, Angalo, Aran, Juan Sadot and other legendary Ilocano characters. Folk songs like Pamulinawen, Manang Biday, Dungdungwen Kanto Unay, Unay and the Iloko dal-lot were popularized.

The second phase of Ilocano migration was from 1908 to 1946 when surplus labor migrated to the plantations of Hawaii and the American West Coast. At the height of migration, the population density of Ilocos Sur was 492 inhabitants per square mile, which made it the most dense region in the Philippines, excluding Manila. The last group of labor migration to Hawaii was in 1946 when 7,365 men were recruited by the U.S. Department of Labor. Vigan was the recruiting center. More than seventy percent of the 63,500 Filipinos in Hawaii are of Ilocano origin.

Economic prosperity
The first half of the 19th century was an economic boom for Ilocos Sur. It was during this period when the cotton, tobacco and indigo industries were encouraged by the government. With the operations of the Royal Company of the Philippines, the textile industry was developed on a large scale and the abolition of the tobacco monopoly accelerated economic progress. The invention of chemical dyes put the indigo industry out of business.

Uneasy peace
The history of Ilocos Sur from the beginning of the Spanish rule to the first decade of the nineteenth century was characterized by revolts against tributes and forced labor as well as monopolies.

The most famous uprising was the Ilocos revolt (1762–1763) better known as Silang's Revolt. This was principally an uprising aimed at the Babaknangs and the alcalde-mayor of Vigan. After Diego Silang's assassination on May 28, 1763, his wife Maria Josefa Gabriela continued the fight until she was captured and hanged publicly on September 20, 1763.

The government's monopoly on basi, the native wine, occurred on September 16, 1817.  Under the command of Ambaristo, the rebels were defeated by a contingent of regular troops and recruits.

On March 25, 1898, Isabelo Abaya fomented an uprising in Candón and raised a red flag in the town plaza. The historic Ikkis ti Candon was the start of several revolutions in the Ilocos Region.

Philippine Revolution and Philippine-American War
Ilocos Sur, like other provinces in the Philippines, was quick to rally behind Gen. Emilio Aguinaldo in the Philippine Revolution of 1896. Upon Vigan's capture, the rebels made Bishop's Palace their headquarters. On March 21, 1898, Don Mariano Acosta of Candón established the provincial revolutionary government.  When General Aguinaldo returned from exile in Hong Kong, he sent General Manuel Tinio to implement guerilla warfare on the Americans. Vigan served as Tinio's headquarters until its occupation by the U.S. 45th Infantry Division under Lt. Col. James Parker on December 4, 1899.  General Gregorio del Pilar died a heroic death on December 2, 1899 at the Tirad Pass in Concepción in a battle against the American Forces under Major C. March.

Under the Americans, a civil government was established in Ilocos Sur on September 1, 1901. Don Mena Crisólogo, a delegate to the Malolos Congress, was the first provincial governor.

World War II
On December 10, 1941, a contingent of Japanese Imperial forces landed in Mindoro, Vigan, Santa, Pandan and Caoayan.

In Cervantes, the Battle of Bessang Pass was fought between General Yamashita's forces and the U.S. 21st Infantry. On April 18, 1945 Ilocos Sur was liberated from the Japanese by the joint efforts of Ilocano guerrillas and American soldiers.

Contemporary history
The 1970s were a dark period for the province as armed men known as the saka-saka (Ilocano literally "bare-footed") terrorized the province.  This reign of terror resulted in the famous burning of the barangays of Ora East and Ora Centro in Bantay. The era ended with the election of Luis "Chavit" Singson as governor.

Geography

Ilocos Sur occupies the central section of the Ilocos Region in northern Luzon. It is bordered by Ilocos Norte to the north, Abra to the northeast, Mountain Province to the east, Benguet to the southeast, La Union to the south, and the South China Sea to the west.

Climate 
The climate is generally dry as defined by the Hernandez climate classification—the dry months are from October to May. The southernmost portion in Cervantes is wet with rain evenly distributed throughout the year while the southeastern part of Sugpon receives less precipitation. The rainy season arrives in August while January and February have the lowest precipitation. January is the coldest.

Administrative divisions
Ilocos Sur comprises 32 municipalities and 2 component cities, which are organized into two legislative districts. There are a total of 768 barangays in the province.

Barangays
The 32 municipalities and 2 cities of the province comprise a total of 768 barangays, with Puro in Magsingal as the most populous in 2010, and Montero in Banayoyo as the least.

Demographics

The 1960 census lists 338,058 people; 64,446 dwelling units of which 2,974 are lighted with electricity; 3227 provided with radio; 7379 served with pipe water; 25,137 served with artesian and pumped water; and 310 using electricity, kerosene and gas for cooking.

Inhabitants
Ilocos Sur is inhabited mostly by Ilocanos belonging to the third largest ethnic group of Austronesian origin. A Spanish chronicler wrote that “the people are very simple, domestic and peaceful, large of body and very strong. “They are highly civilized. They are a most clean race, especially the women in their homes which they keep very neat and clean.”

Miguel de Loarca records around 1582 that the Ilocanos are intelligent as the Zambaleños for they are farmers. The main occupation of the people is agriculture.

Father Juan de Medina noted in 1630 that the natives are ‘the humblest and most tractable known and lived in nest and large settlements'.

Religion
The province is predominantly Roman Catholic with 75% of population adherence. Aglipayan Church is also a considerable large minority with a 20% adherence. Other religious beliefs are represented by other Christian Churches such as Baptist, Iglesia ni Cristo, Methodist, Seventh-day Adventist, other Evangelical Christians as well as Muslims.

Economy

Products and industries 
The people are engaged in farming, producing food crops, mostly rice, corn, vegetable, root crops, and fruits. Non-food crops include tobacco, cotton, and tigergrass. Cottage industries include loom weaving, furniture making, jewelry making, ceramics, blacksmithing, and food processing.

Agriculture

Ilocos Sur's economy is agrarian, but its  of unfertile land is not enough to support a population of 338,579. 

Agricultural crops such as rice, corn tobacco and fruit trees dominate their farm industries. Secondary crops are camote and cassava, sugar cane and onions.

The rapidly growing population, the decreasing fertility of the soil, and the long period between the planting and harvesting season, have forced the people to turn to manufacture and trade. Many Ilocanos go to the Cagayán valley, Central Plains and Mindanao to sell Ilocano woven cloth.

Virginia leaf tobacco is still a premier cash crop, after a windfall brought about by the Tobacco Subsidy Law authored by Congressman Floro Crisólogo in 1964, and later enhanced by the Republic Act No. 7171 authored by Congressman Singson.

Weaving is the most extensive handicraft, once bolstered by the installation of the NDC Textile Mills in Narvacan which supplied the weavers with yarn.

Other industries are burnay and slipper making in Vigan, furniture, cabinet, and statue making in San Vicente, mortar and pestle making in San Esteban, and bolo making in Santa.

Infrastructure

Electricity

Education
Ilocos Sur has 547 public schools including five general high schools, one university, one agricultural college and 56 private schools, 16 of which are Catholic.

Culture
The Ilocos Sur Museum, founded on August 22, 1970, has a collection of cultural treasures which include art include paintings, centuries-old sculptures, pieces of carved furniture, and relics of Spanish European and Chinese cultures that had influenced Ilocano life for centuries.

Chapters of Philippine history and religion are found in the Crisólogo collections which includes family heirlooms, centuries –old "santos" (religious statuettes made of wood or ivory), other ivory images, Vienna furniture, marble-topped tables, ancient-carved beds, rare Chinese porcelains, jars and jarlettes, lamps, Muslim brass wares, and Spanish and Mexican coins.

The Syquia collections, including then President Elpidio Quirino's memorabilia, vie in quality with the Crisólogo collections. But in the midst of a fire scare in Vigan in the late 1908s and 1990s, the relics in the Syquia Mansion were transferred to Manila for safekeeping.

UNESCO Recognitions in Ilocos Sur
UNESCO has inscribed two Ilocos Sur sites in the World Heritage List.

Heritage City of Vigan
In 1999, the Heritage City of Vigan was inscribed in the World Heritage List. UNESCO describes the site as:

"Established in the 16th century, Vigan is the best-preserved example of a planned Spanish colonial town in Asia. Its architecture reflects the coming together of cultural elements from elsewhere in the Philippines, from China and from Europe, resulting in a culture and townscape that have no parallel anywhere in East and South-East Asia."

Santa Maria Church
In 1993, the Baroque Churches of the Philippines, containing 4 properties, was inscribed in the World Heritage List. One of the properties was the Santa Maria Church of Ilocos Sur. UNESCO describes, "[the] unique architectural style [of the churches] is a reinterpretation of European Baroque by Chinese and Philippine craftsmen."

Notable people from Ilocos Sur

 José Burgos — priest and one of the martyrs of Gomburza
 Gabriela Silang — revolutionary leader best known as the first female leader of a Filipino movement for independence from Spain
 Isabelo de los Reyes — prominent Filipino patriot, politician, writer and labor activist. He was the original founder of the Iglesia Filipina Independiente, an independent Philippine nationalist church. He is known as the "Father of Philippine Folklore", the "Father of the Philippine Labor Movement", and the "Father of Filipino Socialism".
 Elpidio Quirino — 6th President of the Philippines, 2nd Vice President of the Philippines
 William Dar — 45th Secretary of Agriculture, and horticulturist
 Sixto Brillantes — 21st chairman of Commission on Elections
 Marcelino Crisólogo - Filipino politician, poet, writer and playwright.
 Jose Ping-ay - Filipino Politician and Founder of Ilocos Sur Cooperative Bank
 Abraham Sarmiento - 119th Associate Justice of the Supreme Court of the Philippines
 Alan Purisima - 17th Chief of the Philippine National Police
 Alfredo Verzosa -  Filipino Catholic Bishop and is venerated as a Servant of God in the Catholic Church
 Leopoldo Jaucian - Filipino Catholic Bishop
 Pedro Bucaneg — poet, and the "Father of Ilocano literature"
 Leona Florentino — poet in the Spanish and Ilocano languages, and the "mother of Philippine women's literature"
 Leon C. Pichay - writer and poet,  King of Ilocano Poets" during the 50s.
 Jose L. de Ocampo - Filipino architect and artist.
 Nestor Redondo -  Filipino comics artist
 Virgilio Redondo - Filipino comics artist
 Philip Vera Cruz - Filipino American labor leader, farmworker, and leader in the Asian American movement
 Jose Maria Sison - Founding Chairman of the Communist Party of the Philippines

References

External links

 
 
 Philippine Standard Geographic Code

 
Provinces of the Philippines
Provinces of the Ilocos Region
States and territories established in 1818
1818 establishments in the Philippines